The Durris transmitting station is a broadcasting and telecommunications facility, situated close to the town of Stonehaven, within Durris Forest, within the area also known historically as Kincardineshire. It is owned and operated by Arqiva, and is the tallest structure in Scotland.

History
It is also a feature in Durris Primary School's newest logo created in 2000 (the logo shows the mast on the hill with the sun and three trees).

It can be seen from the summit of Mither Tap, near Insch, Aberdeenshire and can also be spotted at night on the road down from the Lecht Ski Centre.

Construction
It was constructed in 1966. 38-year-old Thomas Sutherland of Blairgowrie died in its construction on Monday 24 October 1966, falling 175 ft from 300 ft up the mast; the company had a regional office in Edinburgh

Transmissions
Its coverage includes north east Scotland, from St. Andrews in the south to Fraserburgh in the north, including the city of Aberdeen. It also covers much of the North Sea coast between Dunbar and Berwick, although this coverage is not deliberate.

Services listed by frequency

Analogue radio (FM VHF)

Digital radio (DAB)

Analogue television
Analogue television was switched off during September 2010; BBC Two Scotland was closed on 1 September and the remaining four on 15 September.

Digital television

30 September 2018 - present

15 June 2011 - 30 September 2018

15 September 2010 - 15 June 2011

† Temporary channel to avoid interference with Craigkelly transmitter.

Before switchover (until 15 September 2010)

See also
List of masts
List of radio stations in the United Kingdom
List of tallest buildings and structures in Great Britain

References

External links
 Entry for Durris transmitting station at The Transmission Gallery
 Skyscraperpage.com
 Durris Transmitter at thebigtower.com

Buildings and structures in Aberdeenshire
Stonehaven
Towers completed in 1966
Transmitter sites in Scotland